Mbamba Bay is the language spoken along the shores of Mbamba Bay of Lake Malawi, variously (and ambiguously) known as Mwera or Nyasa, is a poorly attested Bantu language of Tanzania.

References

Nyasa languages
Languages of Tanzania
Languages of Zimbabwe
Languages of Zambia